Dom Famularo (born August 26, 1953) is an American drummer, drum teacher, author, clinician and motivational speaker.

Biography 
Famularo was born in Long Island, New York. He started playing when he was 11 and became a professional at the age of 12.  Dom began his career as a performing jazz drummer. He studied under some of the greatest drummers of the 20th century, including Jim Chapin and Joe Morello.  With a passion for jazz and inspiring others, he began a successful drum teaching career, becoming one of the most sought-after clinicians of his time. Some of the most successful jazz and rock drummers have had instruction from Dom.

He has been called Drumming's Global Ambassador due to the many places he visits and vast number of people that hear him speak each year.
Dom is known for his open handed playing style. He is also the first western drummer to perform clinics in China.

He has presented masterclasses and clinics around the globe in United States, Canada, Colombia, Mexico, Brazil, Chile, Argentina, Uruguay, Peru, England, Ireland, Scotland, France, Germany, Belgium, the Netherlands, Luxembourg, Austria, Switzerland, Portugal, Spain, Norway, Sweden, Poland, Serbia, Greece, Italy, Hungary, Costa Rica, Honduras, Puerto Rico, China, Hong Kong, Japan, Taiwan, Philippines, Malaysia, Indonesia, Singapore, Australia, New Zealand, Turkey, Israel, Canary Islands, South Africa, Ukraine, Latvia and Botswana.

He has directed and emceed major drumming expos around the world, and has been one of drumming' s most sought-after private instructors for over 40 years. He has taught many of today's leading drummers, and students regularly fly in from around the globe for intensive study with Dom. Dom acts as Education Director and consultant for several leading drum companies.

Dom uses Mapex drums and Sabian cymbals. Famularo has shared the stage with many famous musicians—some include Steve Gadd, Terry Bozzio, B.B. King, Thomas Lang, Tommy Igoe, Will Calhoun and Chad Smith.  He is also a motivational speaker and the author of "Cycle of Self-Empowerment."

Dom was voted Best Clinician by the readers of Modern Drummer magazine in 2005 and 2006, and by the readers of DRUM! in 2006. He is also the author of It's Your Move and The Cycle of Self-Empowerment, and co-author of The Weaker Side and Drumset Duets (with Stephane Chamberland), Open-Handed Playing (with Claus Hessler), Eighth-Note Rock and Beyond (with Glenn Ceglia), Pedal Control (with Joe Bergamini and Stephane Chamberland) and Groove Facility (with Rob Hirons).

On December 21, 2012, Dom appeared on the national Fox TV show  The Real Winning Edge.

He is involved in developing online teaching methods using websites, including Drumeo, and SABIAN Educators Network (SEN). He resides on Long Island, New York with his wife and 3 sons.

Dom had created the first Wizdom Drumshed School in the world on Long Island (NY) many years ago ("Wizdom" being a mix of the words wizard and Dom). These schools are currently taking place across the globe in collaboration with Dom. In Quebec City, Canada run by Stephane Chamberland, in Marseille, France run by Rob Hirons, in Paris run by Frederick Rimbert and in Italy run by Massimo Russo.

Drum and cymbal setup 
Mapex Drums and Sabian Cymbals:
Mapex Drums – Any Finish
10x9" Tom
12x10" Tom
14x14" Floor Tom
16x16" Floor Tom
22x18" Bass Drum
14x5.5" Mapex Snare Drum
13" HHX Hi-Hats (mounted under ride & china)
14" HHX Hi-Hats
21" HHX Ride
17" HHX Crash
18" HHX Crash
18" HHX China
20" HHX China
12" HHX Splash
10" HHX Splash

References

External links 
 Dom's Website
Interview with Dom Famularo – NAMM Oral History Library (2012)

1953 births
Living people
20th-century American drummers
American male drummers
20th-century American male musicians